James Fawckner Nicholls (1818–1883) was an English antiquarian and librarian.

Life
From a Cornish background, he was born on 26 May 1818 at Sidmouth in Devon, the son of a builder there; his mother was a daughter of Captain James Fawkner of Plymouth. In 1830 he went to sea with an uncle. Two years later he was sent to school at Kentisbeare for six months. He was then taken into the drapery business, and after a short period bought an establishment for himself at Benwick in the Isle of Ely. He next kept a school at Ramsey; and then moved to Manchester, where he was traveller for a firm of paper-stainers. In 1860 he settled in Bristol, where he ran a paper-staining business for eight years.

In 1868 Nicholls was appointed city librarian of Bristol. The old city library, founded in 1613, was reconstituted and extended into three free libraries. In 1876 he was elected a fellow of the Society of Antiquaries of London. He died at Goodwick, Fishguard, Pembrokeshire, on 19 September 1883. Twice married, he left several children.

Works
In 1869 Nicholls published The Remarkable Life, Adventures, and Discoveries of Sebastian Cabot, quoted by Jules Verne in his Explorations of the World. It was criticised by Marie-Armand d'Avezac de Castera-Macaya and Henry Stevens. Nicholls then concentrated on the history and antiquities of Bristol. In March 1870 he began a series of Bristol biographies: just two appeared, Alderman John Whitson: his Life and Times, and Captain Thomas James and George Thomas the Philanthropist. How to see Bristol: a Guide for the Excursionist, the Naturalist, the Archæologist, and the Man of Business (1874) collected articles from local papers, and a second edition appeared in 1877.

The major work by Nicholls was Bristol Past and Present, an illustrated History of Bristol and its Neighbourhood (1881–2), the two parts dealing with the civil history of the city being by him, and the third part treating of church history by his colleague J. Taylor. He published also:

Old Deeds of All Hallow Church, 1875.
Bristol and its Environs, 1875, for the meeting of the British Association.
Penpark Hole, a Roman Lead Mine, 1879.
The Old Hostelries of Bristol, 1882; papers reprinted from transactions of the Bristol and Gloucestershire Archæological Society.
Description of a Find of Roman Coins at Filton, Bristol, 1880; from Proceedings of the Society of Antiquaries.

Notes

 
Attribution
 

1818 births
1883 deaths
English librarians
English antiquarians
Fellows of the Society of Antiquaries of London
People from Sidmouth
19th-century English businesspeople